Vickie Marie Milagrosa Sausa Rushton-Abalos (born May 8, 1992) is a Filipino-British actress, model and beauty pageant titleholder who was crowned Mutya ng Pilipinas International 2011. Rushton eventually gained more exposure in the public eye when she became a housemate in Pinoy Big Brother: All In, where she finished 4th place.

Pageantry

Mutya ng Pilipinas
On December 2, 2011, Rushton was crowned Mutya ng Pilipinas — International 2011 winner. It was in the same pageant where the would-be Miss International 2013, Bea Rose Santiago joined and placed as one of the 10 semi-finalists and was given a special title as Mutya ng Pilipinas Overseas. Being the Mutya ng Pilipinas 2011 winner, Rushton was supposed to represent the Philippines in the Miss Intercontinental 2011 pageant in Alicante, Spain. However, because of the delayed schedule of the local pageant, Kathleen Anne Po was handpicked to represent the Philippines instead.

Binibining Pilipinas
On January 16, 2018, it was confirmed that Rushton will be competing at the Binibining Pilipinas 2018 pageant. On March 18, she was crowned as the 1st Runner-up. Upon, joining the Binibining Pilipinas pageant in 2019 she was considered as an early favorite to win the competition. She collected several corporate awards such as Jag Denim Queen, Miss Ever Bilena, Manila Bulletin Reader's Choice, Poten Cee Gandang Palaban, and Bb. Cream Silk during the pageant. Her failure to give a complete answer during the question and answer portion among the top 15 contestants was regarded as the reason for her not to move up to the next round where the eventual winners to represent the country in international beauty contests were chosen. She said in post-contest interviews that she was distracted when she delivered her answer.

Career

Pinoy Big Brother: All In
On April 27, 2014, Rushton entered the Pinoy Big Brother house as a housemate of Pinoy Big Brother: All In. In the initial stages of the competition, she was portrayed as the pretty girl that was always under the radar; because of this, she was labeled as the one who least contributed in her team. She also was romantically teased by some of her fellow housemates, particularly Cheridel Alejandrino to housemate Daniel Matsunaga, which led to some controversy between her and showbiz boyfriend, Jason Abalos. On Day 79, Rushton was nominated for the first time; she earned 22.96% of the total votes saving her from the eviction. Rushton made it to the Big Night and placed 4th, garnering -0.78% of net votes.

Personal life
Her engagement in 2021 with her long-time partner, actor Jason Abalos, was revealed in June 2022. They were married in a church wedding ceremony in Batangas on September 1 of the same year.

Filmography

Television

Film

References

External links

Pinoy Big Brother contestants
Binibining Pilipinas winners
Mutya ng Pilipinas winners
Filipino people of British descent
Star Magic
1992 births
Living people
Filipino female models
British female models
People from Bacolod
Actresses from Negros Occidental
Visayan people
Hiligaynon people